La casa de las fieras is a Mexican telenovela produced by Teleprogramas Acapulco, SA and originally transmitted by Telesistema Mexicano.

Cast 
Lucy Gallardo
Rita Macedo
Beatriz Baz
Alicia Bonet

References

External links 

Mexican telenovelas
Televisa telenovelas
Spanish-language telenovelas
1967 telenovelas
1967 Mexican television series debuts
1967 Mexican television series endings